Drew Carmody, better known by his stage name L D R U, is an Australian DJ and record producer. His first single, "The Tropics", was  released in 2013. L D R U is best known for the single "Keeping Score" featuring Paige IV. The track reached No. 14 on the Australian ARIA Charts and No. 22 on Triple J Hottest 100, 2015, and was nominated for a 2016 ARIA Award for Best Dance Release and for Breakthrough Artist. LDRU embarked on a capital cities tour of Australia in July 2016. His first studio album, Sizzlar, peaked at No. 66 on the ARIA Charts. The name L D R U derives from the phrase "left, down, right, up", a part of a cheat code used in the Grand Theft Auto series of games.

In October 2017, Drew supported The Chainsmokers on their Australian tour.

Carmody was previously a member of Carmada alongside Max Armata. He left the duo in 2018 to focus on his solo career.

In 2022, L D R U signed a worldwide deal with Warner Music Australia.

Discography

Albums

Singles

Awards and nominations

ARIA Music Awards

|-
! scope="row" rowspan="3"| 2016
| rowspan="3"|  "Keeping Score" (featuring Paige IV)
| ARIA Award for Best Dance Release
| 
|-
| ARIA Award for Breakthrough Artist – Release
| 
|-
| ARIA Award for Song of the Year
| 
|-
|}

References

Australian DJs
Living people
Sony Music Australia artists
Year of birth missing (living people)